Greenwood Township is a township in Clearwater County, Minnesota, United States. The population was 96 at the 2000 census.

Greenwood Township was probably named for its woodlands.

Geography

Demographics
As of the census of 2000, there were 96 people, 35 households, and 28 families residing in the township. The population density was 4.0 people per square mile (1.6/km2). There were 44 housing units at an average density of 1.9/sq mi (0.7/km2). The racial makeup of the township was 93.75% White, 1.04% African American, 1.04% Native American, and 4.17% from two or more races.

There were 35 households, out of which 37.1% had children under the age of 18 living with them, 77.1% were married couples living together, and 20.0% were non-families. 11.4% of all households were made up of individuals, and 2.9% had someone living alone who was 65 years of age or older. The average household size was 2.74 and the average family size was 3.04.

In the township the population was spread out, with 25.0% under the age of 18, 8.3% from 18 to 24, 28.1% from 25 to 44, 18.8% from 45 to 64, and 19.8% who were 65 years of age or older. The median age was 41 years. For every 100 females, there were 134.1 males. For every 100 females age 18 and over, there were 140.0 males.

The median income for a household in the township was $23,125, and the median income for a family was $27,500. Males had a median income of $30,000 versus $32,917 for females. The per capita income for the township was $10,259. There were 29.4% of families and 32.4% of the population living below the poverty line, including 38.5% of under eighteens and 22.6% of those over 64.

References

Townships in Clearwater County, Minnesota
Townships in Minnesota